Bosnia and Herzegovina competed at the 2022 European Championships in Munich from August 11 to August 22, 2022. Bosnia and Herzegovina were represented by 7 competitors in 4 sports.

Competitors
The following is the list of number of competitors in the Championships:

Athletics

Canoeing

Cycling

Road

Men

Table tennis

 
Bosnia and Herzegovina entered 1 man and 3 women.

Men

Women

Mixed

References

2022
Nations at the 2022 European Championships
European Championships